Linden Airport  is an airport serving Linden, the capital of the Upper Demerara-Berbice region of Guyana.

Facilities 

See also

 List of airports in Guyana
 Transport in Guyana

References

External links
OpenStreetMap - Linden
OurAirports - Linden
SkyVector Aeronautical Charts

Airports in Guyana
Upper Demerara-Berbice